FEIS or Feis may refer to:
 Feis, a traditional Gaelic arts and culture festival
 Fellow of the Educational Institute of Scotland
 Herbert Feis (1893–1972), American historian
 Feis (rapper) (1986–2019), Dutch rapper

See also 
 FEI (disambiguation)